Bogart is a town in Clarke and Oconee counties in the U.S. state of Georgia. The town is mostly in Oconee County, with a portion extending into Clarke County. As of the 2020 census, the city had a population of 1,326. The 30622 ZIP code extends outside the boundary of Bogart into the western portion of Athens, giving some of Athens' citizens Bogart mailing addresses. For the Oconee County area of Bogart, the high school is North Oconee High School and the middle school is Malcom Bridge Middle School; for the Clarke County area of Bogart, the high school is Clarke Central High School and the middle school is Burney-Harris-Lyons Middle School.

Geography

Demographics

2020 census

As of the 2020 United States census, there were 1,326 people, 574 households, and 429 families residing in the town.

2000 census
As of the census of 2000, there were 1,049 people, 425 households, and 309 families residing in the city. The racial makeup of the city was 94.09% White, 4.48% African American, 0.10% Native American, 0.38% Asian, 0.67% from other races, and 0.29% from two or more races. Hispanic or Latino of any race were 2.29% of the population.

There were 425 households, out of which 34.8% had children under the age of 18 living with them, 57.2% were married couples living together, 9.9% had a female householder with no husband present, and 27.1% were non-families. 22.1% of all households were made up of individuals, and 8.0% had someone living alone who was 65 years of age or older.  The average household size was 2.47 and the average family size was 2.88.

In the city the population was spread out, with 24.7% under the age of 18, 10.3% from 18 to 24, 30.1% from 25 to 44, 24.5% from 45 to 64, and 10.4% who were 65 years of age or older.  The median age was 35 years. For every 100 females, there were 92.5 males.  For every 100 females age 18 and over, there were 90.4 males.

The median income for a household in the city was $41,190, and the median income for a family was $45,682. Males had a median income of $31,652 versus $28,580 for females. The per capita income for the city was $20,081.  About 9.7% of families and 10.0% of the population were below the poverty line, including 10.5% of those under age 18 and 12.8% of those age 65 or over.

History 
The town was originally named for the influential Creek-Seminole leader Osceola. In 1892, the city was renamed Bogart in honor of a locally respected railroad agent after learning that another Georgia community, in Terrell County, was also called Osceola.  Bogart was once part of Franklin County, then Jackson County, and now sits in Oconee County with a small portion located in Clarke County. Many of the settlers who came to Bogart, came in during the Land Lottery of 1820. When the train from Athens to Atlanta was built in the 1890s, life flourished in Bogart. The city of Bogart was incorporated in 1905. The thriving city had a bank, a mercantile store, a boarding house, a drug store, a railroad depot, three cotton gins, a post office, blacksmith shops, a school, several churches, and gristmills.

Entertainment

From 2005 to 2009, the Nationwide Tour, a second tier professional golf tour in the United States, visited Bogart at Jennings Mill Country Club. However, that venue is only in the Bogart ZIP code and not actually within Bogart city limits. The 2009 version was won by Patrick Sheehan.

References

Clarke County, Georgia, "Bogart Schools - Bogart Georgia (GA) School Information - Public & Private." Public Schools & Private Schools - Local School Directory. Web. 24 June 2010

Towns in Oconee County, Georgia
Towns in Clarke County, Georgia
Towns in Georgia (U.S. state)
Athens – Clarke County metropolitan area